Air Commodore Theodore Jasper Maclean de Lange CBE DFC (born Simla 16 June 1914, died Rotorua 4 July 2005) was a senior officer in the Royal New Zealand Air Force (RNZAF). In his career, he served in the Solomans, Burma, India and Australia. He was awarded the Distinguished Flying Cross (DFC) in 1944 for high courage and devotion during the Pacific War. In the 1965 Queen's Birthday Honours, he was awarded the Commander of the Order of the British Empire (CBE), for his many years of distinguished service in the RNZAF.

References

1914 births
2005 deaths
Royal New Zealand Air Force personnel
New Zealand military personnel of World War II
New Zealand Commanders of the Order of the British Empire
Recipients of the Distinguished Flying Cross (United Kingdom)